Christian Maclagan (1811–10 May 1901) was a Scottish antiquarian and early archaeologist. She is known for her collection of rubbings of Celtic crosses and Pictish stones from across Scotland, and was a pioneer of stratigraphic excavation. Although she lost the use of her right hand due to a medical condition she nevertheless produced numerous drawings, sketches and paintings with her left hand. She took action to help those affected by poverty in Stirling. She refused to sit for portraits although one obituary described her as tall. She was a suffragist. She wrote an autobiography but the script remains lost. She was nominated to be one of Scotland's Heroines honoured at the National Wallace Monument's Hall of Heroes. She died in Ravenscroft, Stirling.

Early life

Daughter of distiller and chemist George Maclagan and Janet Colville of Stirling, she was born on the family's farm at Braehead near Denny. Her father died in 1818, as did her paternal grandfather, Frederick Maclagan, parish minister at Melrose, and her mother moved the family to Stirling. She lived in a house in Pitt Terrace, a wealthy part of the town near St Ninian's Well and the modern Stirling Council offices.

Her mother died in 1858, and until that time Christian Maclagan engaged in philanthropic activities, establishing a Sunday School and subscribing towards the cost of a library. After the Disruption of 1843 she joined the Free Church of Scotland and in 1865 she funded the building of a new kirk. Her relationship with the Free Church soured in the 1870s and she sued to reclaim the church which she then gifted to the established Church of Scotland. She apparently received a bequest from one of her brothers at around the time of her mother's death, and this established her as a woman of some wealth. Her estate was valued at 3100 pounds sterling at her death.

She was well-educated, knowing Latin, French, Greek, and Gaelic well — her paternal grandfather had tried his hand at a translation of the Bible into Gaelic. She also spoke some Italian and was an artist of some skill.

Antiquarian activities

Maclagan theorised that megalithic circles and tombs were the remnants of houses and forts. She believed an academic examination of all such sites would reveal a message, through the archaeological 'language' needed for such examination. The findings of her investigations included rubbings from hundreds of archaeological specimens of various sites and were published at her own expense. She carried out an excavation on the Mither Tap of Bennachie. Some of her theories were considered eccentric to her contemporaries. The dismissal of her views could be due to sexist attitudes of her era, or due to the anthropological comments Maclagan would make alongside her archaeological studies. At least one author criticized her work despite, presumably because of her Christian name, mistaking her for a man.

One of her primary interests were in the brochs of Scotland and she also was one of the pioneers of stratigraphic excavation. She devised a special method for taking rubbings from sculptured stones; the exact details of how this was done were kept secret. Possibly her greatest contribution to posterity was her meticulous collection of rubbings of Celtic Christian crosses and Pictish symbol stones, made from c 1850 onwards. These rubbings include some of the earliest done at Wemyss Cave.

As a woman Maclagan was disbarred from obtaining a fellowship of the Society of Antiquaries of Scotland, and instead she was merely a Lady Associate as were Lady John Scott and Queen Victoria. She told friends she was an antiquarian before Queen Victoria was born. Later she threatened to resign the title since the society read her papers in her absence without her having the opportunity to respond. She could not formally publish with the Society and required a man to publish her work under his name. As a result of this, it has been supposed, she sent her rubbings to the British Museum. She remained a Lady Associate however until the time of her death around the age of 92. The Smith Museum in Stirling contains one of her models of a broch tower and a wooden carving as a tribute to her. She was buried in Stirling's old town cemetery.

This sexism may also have led to her work being overlooked and one of her key discoveries Livilands Broch being lost. A crowdfunding project was launched in 2016 by Stirling Council's Archaeologist Dr Murray Cook to rediscover the broch that she discovered.

Selected publications
 The Hill Forts Stone Circles and Others Structural Remains of Ancient Scotland, Edmonston and Douglas, 1875.
Chips from old stones 1881
 What Mean These Stones? D. Douglas, 1894 (described as a "slight and idiosyncratic work" by Euan MacKie).
 A catalogue raisonné of the British Museum collection of rubbings from ancient sculptured stones. 1898
 On the Round Castles and Ancient Dwellings of the Valley of the Forth, and its Tributary the Teith.
 Notes of a Roman Sculptured Stone recently discovered at Cumbernauld, and of an Inscribed Stone at Stirling, &c. (With Photograph and Copy of the Inscription) (pp 178–9)

Commemoration 
A Historic Environment Scotland commemorative plaque was unveiled at 19 Clarendon Place, Stirling in August 2019.

Bibliography

 The Biographical Dictionary of Scottish Women edited by Elizabeth L. Ewan, Sue Innes, Sian Reynolds, Rose Pipes (2008).
 
 
Scotsman, 13 May 1901; 
Sentinel (Stirling), 14 May 1901; 
Athenæum, 18 May 1901; 
Scots Magazine, 1818; 
Hew Scott's Fasti Eccles. Scot.; 
notes from Miss Maclagan's MS. autobiography, supplied by J. W. Barty, LL.D.; 
notes from W. B. Cook, Stirling;

References

1811 births
1901 deaths
British feminists
Scottish artists
Scottish archaeologists
People from Stirling (council area)
British women archaeologists